William Bradshaw Amos  (born 1945) is a British biologist, Emeritus Scientist at the Medical Research Council (MRC) Laboratory of Molecular Biology (LMB). He led a team that developed the mesolens, a microscope with a giant lens.

Education
Amos was educated at King Edward VII School, Sheffield and graduated from University of Oxford with a Bachelor of Arts degree in 1966, and from University of Cambridge with a PhD in 1970.

Career and research
Amos was Research Assistant from 1966 to 1967, Research Student from 1967 to 1970, and Research Fellow from 1970 to 1974 at King's College, Cambridge. He taught at the Department of Zoology, Cambridge from 1973 to 1978.

Awards and honours
His awards and honours include:

1994 Mullard Award of the Royal Society
1995 Rank Prize for Optoelectronics 
2002 Progress Medal of the Royal Photographic Society
2002 Ernst Abbe Award for Lifetime Achievement of the New York Microscopical Society

References

People educated at King Edward VII School, Sheffield
20th-century British biologists
21st-century British biologists
Fellows of the Royal Society
Alumni of The Queen's College, Oxford
Alumni of Pembroke College, Cambridge
Living people
1945 births